Chaetostoma vasquezi is a species of catfish in the family Loricariidae. It is native to South America, where it occurs in the basins of the Orinoco, the Caura River, and the Caroní River in Venezuela. The species reaches 18.7 cm (7.4 inches) SL.

References 

Fish described in 1998
vasquezi
Catfish of South America
Fish of Venezuela